Cynthia Olson may refer to:
SS Cynthia Olson, American cargo ship built in 1918 and sunk in 1941
Cynthia Olson Reichhardt (also published as C. J. Olson), American physicist

See also
Susan Olsen, known for playing Cindy (Cynthia Brady) in The Brady Bunch